Propargyl alcohol, or 2-propyn-1-ol, is an organic compound with the formula C3H4O.  It is the simplest stable alcohol containing an alkyne functional group.  Propargyl alcohol is a colorless viscous liquid that is miscible with water and most polar organic solvents.

Reactions and applications
Propargyl alcohol polymerizes with heating or treatment with base.  It is used as a corrosion inhibitor, a metal complex solution, a solvent stabilizer and an electroplating brightener additive. It is also used as an intermediate in organic synthesis. Secondary and tertiary substituted propargylic alcohols undergo catalyzed rearrangement reactions to form α,β-unsaturated carbonyl compounds via the Meyer–Schuster rearrangement and others. It can be oxidized to propynal or propargylic acid.

As an indication of the electronegativity of an sp carbon, propargyl alcohol is significantly more acidic (pKa = 13.6) compared to its sp2-containing analog allyl alcohol (pKa = 15.5), which is in turn more acidic than the fully saturated (sp3 carbons only) n-propyl alcohol (pKa = 16.1).

Preparation 
Propargyl alcohol is produced by the copper-catalysed addition of formaldehyde to acetylene as a by-product of the industrial synthesis of but-2-yne-1,4-diol. It can also be prepared by dehydrochlorination of 3-chloro-2-propen-1-ol by NaOH.

Safety 
Propargyl alcohol is a flammable liquid, toxic by inhalation, highly toxic by ingestion, toxic by skin absorption, and corrosive.

See also 
 Alkynylation
 Allyl alcohol
 Propargyl
 Propargyl chloride

References

External links 
 [http://nj.gov/health/eoh/rtkweb/documents/fs/1597.pdf Hazardous substance fact sheet for propargyl alcohol
 CDC - NIOSH Pocket Guide to Chemical Hazards

Alkynols
Primary alcohols
Propargyl compounds